Barentsjøkulen is a glacier on Barentsøya, Svalbard. It is named after the Barents Island, which again is named after Dutch explorer Willem Barentsz. Barents Island is on the Barents Sea. 

The glacier has the four offshoots Besselsbreen, Willybreen, Freemanbreen and Duckwitzbreen.

See also
List of glaciers in Svalbard

References

Glaciers of Svalbard
Barentsøya